The Mwogo River is a river in western Rwanda that is a tributary of the Nyabarongo River.

Course

The Mwogo rises in forested country in southern Rwanda to the east of the Congo-Nile Divide.
It has its sources in the Kitabi sector of the Nyamagabe District. 
It runs eastward past Nyarusiza into the Huye District.
It runs in a northeast direction through the western part of this district, entering the Nyanza district. 
In Nyanza district it runs northeast, passing Mweya at the point where the Gihimbi River enters it from the left.
Below this point it is joined by the Rukarara River from the left.
It then forms the western boundary of Ruhango District until it is joined from the left by the Mbirurume River just south of Bwakira.
The combined stream is called the Nyabarongo River, which continues northward.

Hydrology

The Mwogo is one of the main headwaters of the Nyawarungu river.
In parts of the river valley the hills have been cleared of hills, causing erosion and silting problems.  Efforts are being made to replant trees.
The Mwogo and Rukarara provide is the main source of water for the town of Nyanza.

References
Notes

Citations

Sources

Rivers of Rwanda